George Raymond "Ray" Satchler (14 June 1926, London, UK – 28 March 2010, Shelton, Washington) was a British-American nuclear physicist.

Biography
After serving from 1944 to 1948 the Royal Air Force, Satchler studied at the University of Oxford, where he graduated in 1951 with a B.A. and an M.A. and in 1955 with a doctorate in physics. His thesis advisor was John Ashley Spiers. As a postdoc Satchler was from 1956 to 1957 a research associate at the University of Michigan and from 1956 to 1959 a research fellow at Imperial Chemical Industries. He was a physicist at Oak Ridge National Laboratory, from 1959 to 1996, when he retired. From 1994 to 2005 he was a professor at the University of Tennessee. He was the author or co-author of over 275 papers.

Satchler was elected a Fellow of the American Physical Society (APS) in 1961. In 1976 he was named a Corporate Fellow of Oak Ridge National Laboratory, which at that time was operated by the Union Carbide Corporation under a contract with the U.S. federal government. In 1977 he received, jointly with Stuart Thomas Butler, the Tom W. Bonner Prize in Nuclear Physics for "their discovery that direct nuclear reactions can be used to determine angular momenta of discreet nuclear states and for their systematic exploitation of this discovery permitting the determination of spins, parities and quantitative properties of nuclear wave functions."

In Yorkshire in 1948 Satchler married Margaret Patricia "Pat" Enid Gibson. Upon his death he was survived by two daughters and a grandson.

Selected publications

Articles

Books
 with David M. Brink: Angular momentum 1962. 2nd edition 1971. 3rd edition. Clarendon Press, Oxford 1993, ISBN 0-19-851759-9
 Introduction to nuclear reactions 1980. 2nd edition Oxford University Press, Oxford 1990, ISBN 0-333-51484-X.
 Direct nuclear reactions. Oxford University Press, Oxford 1983, ISBN 0-19-851269-4.

References

1926 births
2010 deaths
Alumni of the University of Oxford
20th-century American physicists
21st-century American physicists
American nuclear physicists
20th-century British physicists
21st-century British physicists
British emigrants to the United States
English nuclear physicists
Fellows of the American Physical Society
Oak Ridge National Laboratory people
Theoretical physicists